Agyneta usitata is a species of sheet weaver found in Angola and Nigeria. It was described by Locket in 1968.

References

usitata
Spiders of Africa
Invertebrates of Angola
Invertebrates of West Africa
Spiders described in 1968